Pachliopta liris is a species of butterfly from the family Papilionidae that is found on Timor, Wetar Is. and Savu Is.

The wingspan is 100–110 mm. The wings are dark-brown with red spots and white bands. The red spots are absent in females. The females are darker than the males.

Subspecies
Pachliopta liris liris (Timor)
Pachliopta liris aberrans (Butler, 1883) (Timor)
Pachliopta liris senescens (Röber, 1891) (Kisser)
Pachliopta liris wetterensis (Rothschild, 1895) (Wetar)
Pachliopta liris pallidus (Rothschild, 1895) (Leti Islands)
Pachliopta liris gaetus Fruhstorfer (Savu Islands)
Pachliopta liris seruaensis (Arima & Morimoto, 1991) (Serua Island)

References

Pachliopta
Butterflies described in 1819
Insects of Timor
Butterflies of Indonesia